The Daunians were an Iapygian tribe that inhabited northern Apulia in classical antiquity. Two other Iapygian tribes, the Peucetians and the Messapians, inhabited central and southern Apulia respectively. All three tribes spoke the Messapic language, but had developed separate archaeological cultures by the seventh century BC. 

The Daunians lived in the Daunia region, which extended from the Daunian Mountains river in the southeast to the Gargano peninsula in the northwest. This region is mostly coincident with the Province of Foggia and part of Province of Barletta-Andria-Trani today. Daunians and Oscans came into contact in northern Daunia and southern Samnite regions. Gradually, parts of northern Daunia became "Oscanized".

Name
The ethnonym is connected to the name of the wolf, plausibly the totemic animal of this nation. The cult of the wolf was widespread in ancient Italy and was related to the Arcadian mystery cult. Daunos means wolf, according to ancient glosses, and is cognate with Greek τηαυνος (thaunos) (compare τηēριον (thērion) in the lexicon of Hesychius of Alexandria), from an Indo-European root *dhau- 'to strangle', meaning literally 'strangler'. Among the Daunian towns one may mention Lucera (Leucaria) and among other nations the ethnonym of the Lucani (Loucanoi) and that of the Hirpini, from another word meaning 'wolf'. The outcome of the Proto-Indo-European voiced aspirate *dh is proper to the Illyrian languages and so is different from the corresponding Latin faunus and Oscan, which is not attested.

Origins

At the end of the Bronze Age (11th-10th centuries BC) and during the transition to the Iron Age, Illyrian groups from the eastern Adriatic migrated to Italy. The descendants of the tribes which arrived in Apulia, collectively known as the Iapygians, were the Peucetians, Messapians and Daunians. The broader region was inhabited by Italic peoples of Southern Italy with whom the Iapygians maintained contacts; among them are the Ausones/Oscans, Sabines, Lucani, Paeligni, Bruttii, Campanians, Aequi, Samnites and Frentani. Strabo in a mythological construction to explain the foundation of Taranto, connects the Iapygians with Cretans. Strabo recounts that they were descendants of Iapyx and a Cretan woman. Archaeological material shows little contact between Iapygians and Greek colonists. The retroactive ascription of a Cretan or Arkadian heritage for the Iapygians was simply constructed for political purposes of the time these sources were written.

Genetics

A genetic study published in 2022 examined DNA extracted from three necropoleis: Ordona, Salapia and San Giovanni Rotondo, which during the Iron Age have been linked to the Daunian region. Most samples from Ordona and Salapia date to the Daunian period and some samples from San Giovanni Rotondo date more broadly to the Iron Age. Paternal haplogroups of seven Iron Age samples were identified. Two paternal lineages of the Iron Age samples belong to J-M241, one of them could be further processed as J-L283+. Two Iron Age samples belonged to R-M269, one further designated as Z2103+ and one to I-M223.

Iron Age Daunians showed the highest autosomal affinity with Early Iron Age Illyrian populations from Croatia and populations which were formed in Italy in the Roman Republican era, which both can be broadly included in a pan-Mediterraean genetic continuum (stretching from Crete to Republican Rome and the Iberian peninsula). Links to Minoans/Crete and Iron Age Greeks/Arkadia are less likely. A parsimonious explanation of the Daunian's origin favors a genetic continuity between the Daunians and the population that inhabited the area prior to the historical period that was analyzed, although additional influences from Croatia (ancient Illyria) cannot be excluded, as described by the material remains and the available historical sources.

Presence in ancient Italy

The Daunii were similar to but also different from the Peucetii and Messapii, who settled in central and southern Puglia. Having been also less influenced by the Campanian civilization, it had thus a more peculiar culture, featuring in particular the Daunian steles, a series of funerary monuments sculpted in the 7th-6th centuries BC in the plain south of Siponto, and now mostly housed in the National Archeological Museum of Manfredonia. Particularly striking is the Daunian pottery (as yet little studied) which begins with geometric patterns but which eventually includes crude human, bird and plant figures.

The main Daunian centers were Teanum Apulum (within the modern San Paolo di Civitate), Uria Garganica, the location of which though is not known with certainty, Casone, Lucera, Merinum (Vieste), Monte Saraceno (near Mattinata), Siponto, Coppa Nevigata, Cupola, Salapia (near Cerignola and Manfredonia), Arpi (near Foggia), Aecae (near Troia), Vibinum (Bovino), Castelluccio dei Sauri, Herdonia (Ordona), Ausculum (Ascoli Satriano), Ripalta (near Cerignola), Canosa di Puglia, Lavello and Venosa. Since its settlement, Messapic was in contact with the Italic languages of the region. In the centuries before Roman annexation, the frontier between Messapic and Oscan ran through Frentania-Irpinia-Lucania-Apulia, the transboundary region between Daunians and Oscan-speaking Italic groups. An "Oscanization" and "Samnitization" process gradually took place which is attested in contemporary sources via the attestation of dual identities for settlements. In these regions an Oscan/Lucanian population and a large Daunian element intermixed in different ways. Larinum, a settlement which has produced a large body of Oscan onomastics is described as a "Daunian city" and Horace who was from Venusia in the transboundary area between the Daunians and the Lucanians described himself as  "Lucanian or Apulian". The creation of Roman colonies in southern Italy after the early 4th century BCE had a great impact in the Latinization of the area.

There are numerous testimonies among ancient authors (Pseudo-Scylax, Virgil, Festus, Servius) of a presence of the Daunians beyond the Apennines in Campania and Latium where some towns claimed Diomedian origins. The most notable instance is Ardea, the centre of the Rutulians who were considered Daunians: Vergil writes that Turnus' father was Daunus. Festus writes that a King Lucerus of Ardea fought along with Romulus against Titus Tatius and this is the origin of the name of the Roman Luceres.

Culture

The Iron Age Daunian material culture persisted quite different from their Italic neighbours until the region was encompassed into the Roman Republic in the 3rd century BC. This cultural distinction was due in part because of their geographical area, which was distant from the Ancient Greek centres of Magna Graecia, and in part because of their close relations with the peoples on the other coast of the Adriatic Sea with whom they retained direct contacts across the sea.

Tattooing 
The custom of tattooing among Daunians can be detected in Daunian stelae and in matt-painted ollae. It can also be conceivably identified on the wall of a late 4th-century tomb chamber from Arpi, in which a painting shows tattoos on the arms of the 'priestess' riding a quadriga. The tattooing practice is most often found in preliterate tribal communities, with women playing the chief role, both performing the ritual of applying tattoos and wear them. Among other things the tattoos may have been a symbol of sexual maturity, ancestry and tribal affiliations, as well as religious beliefs. Forearms were the most common tattooed parts of the body among Daunians.

In the Graeco-Roman world tattooing was conceived as a barbaric custom that was used exclusively for punitive or ownership purposes, but the Daunian perception of tattooing was different, as it was a deep and long-standing cultural embodiment distinguishing them from other cultures, as occurred among Illyrians and Thracians. The writings of ancient authors like Herodotus (5th century BC) and Strabo (1st century BC) show that in the Balkans tattooing was in the purview of the elites; iconographic and literary sources reveal in particular that it was restricted to the female members of society. In the western Balkans, isolated from outside influences, the practice of tattooing continued until the early 20th century in Albania and Bosnia, regions that in antiquity were part of the area of Illyria, where Daunian groups conceivably originated from. Besides of religious beliefs, the accounts of the early 20th century reveal that the tattooing custom in the Balkans was originally connected with a fertility rite, being associated with the beginning of menstruation, thus proving that a girl had become a woman.

See also 
 
 Calchus, mythological Daunian king
 Tavoliere delle Puglie
 Daunian pottery
 List of ancient Illyrian peoples and tribes

References

Sources

External links

Geography of Apulia
Geographical, historical and cultural regions of Italy